Back-bond, or back-letter, in Scots law, is a deed qualifying the terms of another deed, or declaratory of the purposes for which another deed has been granted. Thus an ex facie absolute disposition, qualified by a back-bond expressing the limited nature of the right actually held by the person to whom the disposition is made, would constitute what in England is termed a deed of trust.

References 

Scots law
Real property law
Legal documents
Scots private law
Equity (law)
Wills and trusts
Legal terminology